Andrew Poturalski (born January 14, 1994) is an American professional ice hockey center currently playing with the Coachella Valley Firebirds in the American Hockey League (AHL) while under contract to the Seattle Kraken of the National Hockey League (NHL).

He is a 2 time winner of the American Hockey League (AHL) Calder Cup in 2019 and 2022. He is also the reinging AHL Point scoring Title winner having won the award consecutively in2020-21, and 2021-22.

Early life
Poturalski was born on January 14, 1994, in Williamsville, New York to parents Joseph and Diane. His mother formerly played softball at Iowa and Erie Community College while his father is a football officiator. Poturalski originally wished to play goaltender but his parents convinced him to be a skater due to the price of goalie equipment.

Playing career

Amateur
Growing up in New York, Poturalski played midget ice hockey with the Wheatfield Blades under former NHL player Peter Scamurra. He then enrolled at Nichols School and played on their varsity ice hockey team in the Conference of Independent Schools of Ontario Athletic Association for three seasons. While attending Nichols School in 2011, Poturalski joined the Ontario Junior Hockey League's Buffalo Jr. Sabres. Early in his rookie season, he confirmed his commitment to join the New Hampshire Wildcats men's ice hockey for the 2013–14 Hockey East season. By the end of October, Poturalski was named to the NHL Central Scouting preliminary "Watch List" for the 2012 NHL Entry Draft. At the time, he was tied for fourth in OJHL in scoring with 27 points as well as third with 17 assists. Poturalski finished the 2011–12 OJHL season with 16 goals and 22 assists in 33 regular season games before being loaned to the Cedar Rapids RoughRiders in the United States Hockey League. However, after playing in two games and recording three points, Poturalski's season was cut short due to a broken ankle. He then broke his fibula in a "freak on-ice accident" as he preparing over the summer for the following season.

After rehabbing his ankle, Poturalski made his 2012–13 USHL season debut mid-October and immediately scored three goals and recorded two assists. His first goal proved to be the game-winner in a 4–3 victory over the Indiana Ice while he then collected a career-high four points in a 7–5 win. As a result, Poturalski was named the co-recipient of the CCM Forward of the Week on October 23.

College
In his sophomore season with the Wildcats in 2015–16, Poturalski led the team and conference in scoring with 52 points in just 37 games. Earning select to the East First-Star Team and named as a finalist for the Hobey Baker Award, Poturalski opted to leave college early to pursue a professional career, in agreeing to a two-year entry-level contract with the Carolina Hurricanes on March 9, 2016.

Professional
During his first full professional season in 2016–17, Poturalski was initially assigned to AHL affiliate, the Charlotte Checkers. Poturalski was leading the club in assists and scoring when he received his first recall to the NHL by the Hurricanes on April 4, 2017. He made his debut that night in a 5–3 defeat to the Minnesota Wild. After two games with the Hurricanes, Poturalski was returned to Charlotte to play out the remainder of the year.

Following that season, Poturalski was invited to the Hurricanes training camp but began the 2017–18 season with the Checkers after being cut.

In the 2018–19 season, had a stand out season with the league leading Charlotte Checkers, scoring 23 goals and 70 points in 72 games, to earning a selection to the AHL Second All-Star Team. In the post-season, he led the Checkers to the 2019 Calder Cup Championship after collecting 12 goals and 23 points. Poturalski was named the Jack A. Butterfield Trophy as the playoffs MVP after leading all skaters in points and goals.

On July 2, 2019, Poturalski left the Hurricanes organization as a free agent to sign a one-year, two-way contract with the Anaheim Ducks.

After a successful stint in the AHL with the San Diego Gulls, Poturalski returned to the Hurricanes as a free agent, signing a one-year, two-way contract on August 11, 2021.

As a free agent at the conclusion of his contract with the Hurricanes, Poturalski was signed to a two-year, $1.525 million contract with the Seattle Kraken on July 13, 2022.

Personal life
Poturalski and his wife Haley have one son together.

Career statistics

Awards and honors

References

External links

1994 births
AHCA Division I men's ice hockey All-Americans
American men's ice hockey centers
Carolina Hurricanes players
Cedar Rapids RoughRiders players
Charlotte Checkers (2010–) players
Chicago Wolves players
Coachella Valley Firebirds players
Living people
New Hampshire Wildcats men's ice hockey players
San Diego Gulls (AHL) players
Undrafted National Hockey League players